The Royal Air Force Institute of Aviation Medicine was a Royal Air Force aviation medicine research unit active between 1945 and 1994.

Early days 

The RAF Institute of Aviation Medicine (IAM) was opened on 30 April 1945 by the Princess Royal.  It was located on land to the south side of the Farnborough Airfield in Hampshire, and was successor to the wartime RAF Physiological Laboratory.  Initially having separate sections for acceleration, altitude, biochemistry, biophysics, personal equipment and teaching, its mandate was to conduct both pure and applied research in support of flying personnel.  Initially run by Dr Bryan Matthews, Group Captain Bill Stewart was appointed head in 1946. A former pupil of the Hamilton Academy school, Stewart was to be promoted to Air Vice-Marshal, and awarded CB and CBE. The Stewart Lecture at the Royal Aeronautical Society was established in his memory in 1969.

The IAM obtained a decompression chamber (moved from the Physiological Laboratory) in 1945, and this was supplemented by a climatic chamber in 1952, and human centrifuge in 1955 (the latter facility is still in operation and was designated a Grade 2 Listed Building in August 2007).

Additionally, the Institute was responsible for a number of mobile decompression chambers and the training of operators for chambers deployed at certain RAF operational stations with the object of familiarising flying personnel with the effects of anoxia at operational altitudes.

Heyday 

The IAM became a world leading centre for aviation medicine research in the 1960s and 1970s, gaining additional facilities, and continuing an active flight research programme that commenced in World War II.  Research into protection against the effects of high altitude, high G force, heat and cold stress, noise and vibration, sleep and wakefulness, spatial disorientation, vision, aviation psychology and human error, and aircraft accident investigation dominated activities at the IAM.  Much work was done to develop and improve aircrew life support equipment.

Latter history 

The IAM ceased to exist in 1994, when many research staff and facilities were transferred to the DERA Centre for Human Sciences.  In the RAF, the spiritual successor to the IAM is the RAF Centre of Aviation Medicine, which opened in 1998 at RAF Henlow in Bedfordshire, and conducts training and operational support for RAF aircrew.

Commanding Officers 
1945-46 Sir Bryan Matthews
1946-67 AVM William K Stewart
1967-74 AVM Henry L Roxburgh
1975-88 AVM Peter Howard
 1988-92 AVM John Ernsting

References

1994 disestablishments in the United Kingdom
Aviation medicine organizations
Aviation organisations based in the United Kingdom
Aviation research institutes
Farnborough, Hampshire
Medical units and formations of the United Kingdom
Organisations based in Hampshire
Research institutes in Hampshire
Royal Air Force
Military medical research organizations of the United Kingdom